Moreau S. Crosby (December 2, 1839 – September 12, 1893) was an American politician who served in the Michigan Senate from 1873 to 1874 and as the 22nd lieutenant governor of Michigan from 1881 to 1885. he died at age 53 in Boston.

References

1839 births
1893 deaths
Republican Party Michigan state senators
Lieutenant Governors of Michigan
19th-century American politicians